Columbia Pike may refer to:
Columbia Pike (Maryland), U.S. Route 29 from White Oak to Ellicott City
Columbia Pike (Virginia), State Route 244 in Fairfax and Arlington Counties

See also
Columbia Turnpike (disambiguation)